This is a list of OECD countries by long-term unemployment rate published by the OECD. This indicator refers to the number of persons who have been unemployed for one year or more as a percentage of the labour force (the sum of employed and unemployed persons). Unemployed persons are defined as those who are currently not working but are willing to do so and actively searching for work.

Rankings

See also

References

Further reading

External links

 Economic Policy Institute
 Current unemployment rates by country
 OECD Unemployment statistics
 Unemployment statistics by Lebanese-economy-forum, World Bank data
 Labour and unemployment statistics by country
 Thermal maps of the world's unemployment percentage rates – by country, 2007–2010

OECD
International quality of life rankings
Unemployment